Le Nouvelliste is the name of:

Le Nouvelliste (Haiti), a Haitian international newspaper, based in Port-au-Prince, Haiti
Le Nouvelliste (Quebec), Mauricien regional newspaper, based in Trois-Rivieres, Quebec.
Le Nouvelliste (Valais), Valais regional newspaper, based in Sion, Switzerland.